Thomas Ereú (born October 25, 1979 in Acarigua) is a volleyball player from Venezuela, who won the gold medal with the men's national team at the 2003 Pan American Games in Santo Domingo, Dominican Republic. In the final Ereu's team defeated Cuba 3-0 (25-23, 25–18, 25-20).

References
 FIVB Profile
 Legavolley profile

1979 births
Living people
Venezuelan men's volleyball players
Volleyball players at the 2008 Summer Olympics
Olympic volleyball players of Venezuela
Volleyball players at the 2003 Pan American Games
Volleyball players at the 2007 Pan American Games
Pan American Games gold medalists for Venezuela
People from Acarigua
Pan American Games medalists in volleyball
Medalists at the 2003 Pan American Games
20th-century Venezuelan people
21st-century Venezuelan people